Aestheticization or Aestheticisation can refer to:
Aestheticization of politics
Aestheticization of violence